Allokutzneria multivorans is a bacterium from the genus Allokutzneria which has been isolated from soil from a river bank from the Nujiang River in Yunnan, China.

References

Pseudonocardiales
Bacteria described in 2013